(German for The Dead City), Op. 12, is an opera in three acts by Erich Wolfgang Korngold set to a libretto by Paul Schott, a collective pseudonym for the composer and his father, Julius Korngold. It is based on the 1892 novel Bruges-la-Morte by Georges Rodenbach.

Origins
Rodenbach's novel  had already been adapted by the author into a play. Trebitsch was a friend of Korngold's father, Julius. The two met in the street one day and got into a conversation about a possible operatic adaptation. Trebitsch later met Erich, who was enthusiastic about the project. Trebitsch recalled "[I] met the young master Erich Wolfgang Korngold in search of a scenario or, even better, a mood or operatic background that could be dramatically elaborated. I urged him to take up ." Julius commented on the way the project evolved:

Father and son decided to adapt the play themselves, and co-wrote the libretto, using the pseudonym Paul Schott. Julius decided to change the plot so that the murder occurs in a dream, rather than in actuality, as in the original. Korngold started the composition in 1916. He left it for a year to take up military service before resuming and completing the score.

Performance history

When  had its premiere on December 4, 1920, Korngold was just 23 years old with two short one-act operas,  and Violanta, already to his name. The success of these earlier works was so great that  was subject to a fierce competition among German theatres for the right to the world premiere. In the end, an unusual double premiere was arranged and the opera opened simultaneously at the Stadttheater Hamburg and Cologne (Glockengasse). In Cologne, the conductor was Otto Klemperer, and his wife Johanna Geisler sang Marietta. In Hamburg, Korngold himself was in the theatre, and the conductor was Egon Pollak. The opera's theme of overcoming the loss of a loved one resonated with contemporary audiences of the 1920s who had just come through the trauma and grief of World War I, and this undoubtedly fuelled the work's popularity.

 was one of the greatest hits of the 1920s. Within two years of its premiere it had circled the globe, including several performances at the Metropolitan Opera in New York City. The Berlin première was on 12 April 1924 with Lotte Lehmann as Marietta/Marie and Richard Tauber as Paul, conducted by George Szell.

But the work was banned by the Nazi régime because of Korngold's Jewish ancestry and after World War II it fell into obscurity. The key postwar revivals of the piece were at the Vienna Volksoper (1967) and the New York City Opera (1975). In recent years, however, the work has enjoyed notable revivals, among others at the Theater Bonn, the Royal Opera House, the San Francisco Opera and at the Vienna State Opera.

The French premiere of the opera took place in a concert performance in 1982 at the Paris Théâtre des Champs-Élysées.

The opera received its UK premiere on 14 January 1996 in a concert performance by the Kensington Symphony Orchestra conducted by Russell Keable at the Queen Elizabeth Hall, with Ian Caley (Paul) and Christine Teare (Marie/Marietta). The first UK staged performance was on 27 January 2009 at the Royal Opera House, Covent Garden.

The opera was first performed in Latin America at Teatro Colón in Buenos Aires, Argentina, on September 19, 1999, with Carlos Bengolea as Paul, Cynthia Makris as Marie/Marietta and David Pittman-Jennings as Frank; Stefan Lano was the conductor.

In Australia, the work was first premiered by Opera Australia on 30 June 2012 at the Sydney Opera House, with Cheryl Barker as Marie/Marietta, and Stefan Vinke as Paul, conducted by Christian Badea, directed by Bruce Beresford. In 1986, Beresford directed the episode "Glück das mir verblieb" of Aria.

Roles

Synopsis
Place: Bruges, Belgium, called the Dead City for its pious gloom
Time: End of 19th century
Background: Paul lives in his house in Bruges where his young wife, Marie, had died some years before. Paul has not come to terms with the reality of her death. Until the action of the opera begins, no one had been in the room except himself and his housekeeper Brigitta.

Act 1
Brigitta is showing Frank, an old friend of Paul's, in Bruges on a visit, the locked room, explaining that only the day before, Paul had unexpectedly announced the room could be open again. Paul arrives, excitedly insisting that Marie still lives. He tells Frank that the day before he met a woman on the streets of Bruges who exactly resembles Marie (indeed, Paul wants to believe she is Marie resurrected) and has invited her back to his home. Frank leaves, promising to return shortly. The woman, whose name is Marietta, appears for her rendezvous with Paul. She is in Bruges as a dancer in an opera company performing Meyerbeer’s . Without explaining his motivation, he gives her a scarf to put on and a lute, recreating a photograph of Marie. He asks her to sing a song that Marie used to sing (Lute Song,""), joining in on the second verse, which ends with the words  (believe, there is a resurrection). They hear some of her opera company colleagues pass by in the street. Marietta wants to go wave at them but Paul stops her, fearing scandal if the neighbors should see her in his rooms. She dances for him (""), but breaks off with the excuse that she must leave for rehearsal, hinting that he might seek and find her again. Paul meanwhile is driven into a state of extreme anxiety.

Torn between his loyalty to Marie and his interest in Marietta he collapses into a chair and begins to hallucinate. He sees Marie's ghost step out of her portrait. She urges him to admit he is tempted by the other woman.

Act 2
From this point in the story until almost the end of the opera, the events are all part of a vision taking place in Paul's mind.

It is a moonlit evening. Paul is standing alongside a canal, outside the solitary house where Marietta lives. The door is locked. He has given in to his passion for her, though he views it as a sin. A group of nuns passes, among whom is Brigitta dressed as a novice. She tells Paul she has left him because of his sin and passes on. Frank appears and Paul realizes that they are rivals for Marietta's affection, when Frank shows him he has the key to Marietta's house. Paul seizes the key from him and Frank passes on. Paul retreats to watch from a distance as boats come down the canal, bearing members of the opera company, among them Viktorin (the stage manager), Fritz (the Pierrot), Count Albert (a wealthy hanger-on) as well as others who all come off the boats. Viktorin sings a serenade to the still-unseen Marietta. Marietta herself then appears and explains she missed the rehearsal because she was not in the mood for it and had slipped away. She flirts with the Count. On her request, Fritz sings a nostalgic song (""). As they begin the enactment, Paul can bear it no longer and comes out of hiding to confront the group. Marietta defuses the situation by sending the others away. They have a tense quarrel during which Marietta finally realizes that Paul's obsession with her stems from her resemblance to his dead wife. She insists he love her for herself and they go together to Paul's house where she intends to break the hold of the dead Marie.

Act 3
Paul's vision continues. Back in his house, where he and Marietta have spent the night, it is morning on the day of a religious festival. Paul watches the festival procession from a window in the Temple of the Past, but doesn't want Marietta next to him in case someone outside should see them together. His preoccupation reaches the point where Paul imagines the procession is passing through the room. Marietta is increasingly fed up and starts to taunt him by dancing seductively while stroking his dead wife's hair. In a rage, Paul grabs the lock of hair and strangles Marietta with it. Staring at her dead body he exclaims "Now she is exactly like Marie."

At this point Paul's vision ends. As Paul comes back to reality, he is astonished that Marietta's body is nowhere to be found. Brigitta enters and informs him that Marietta has come back to pick up her umbrella which she left at the house when she departed a few minutes earlier. Marietta comes in to take the umbrella and leaves as Frank returns, as he had promised. Paul tells Frank he will not see Marietta again. Frank announces he is leaving Bruges, and asks if Paul will come too, to which he replies, "I will try". The opera ends with a reprise of "", with however the last words now "Here, there is no resurrection". He gives the room a farewell glance as the curtain falls.

Recordings
1952: Bayerischer Rundfunk studio production, available from Opera Today which includes Maud Cunitz and Karl Friedrich, Fritz Lehmann conducting
 1975: RCA Victor recording, with Carol Neblett, René Kollo, Hermann Prey, and Benjamin Luxon, conducted by Erich Leinsdorf, RCA Victor CD 87767, recorded in Studio 1 des Bayerischen Rundfunks im Münchner Funkhaus in June 1975
 1983: Deutsche Oper Berlin, with James King, Karan Armstrong, and William Murray, conducted by Heinrich Hollreiser, and directed by Götz Friedrich (DVD: Arthaus Musik 101 656)
 1996: Leif Segerstam, Dalayman, Tobiasson, Sunnegårdh, Bergström, live in Stockholm, on Naxos
 2001: , Angela Denoke and the Orchestre philharmonique de Strasbourg, conducted by Jan Latham Koenig, Opéra national du Rhin 2001, (DVD: Arthaus Musik 100 343)
 2003: Franz Welser-Möst, Emily Magee (Marietta / Die Erscheinung Mariens), Cornelia Kallisch (Brigitta), Norbert Schmittberg (Paul), Olaf Bär (Frank / Fritz), live in Zurich, EMI
 2004: Donald Runnicles, Angela Denoke (Marietta / Die Erscheinung Mariens), Daniela Denschlag (Brigitta), Torsten Kerl (Paul), Bo Skovhus (Frank / Fritz), live in Salzburg, Orfeo
 2009: Sebastian Weigle and the  recorded the opera live in November 2009 for Oehms Classics.
 2009: Teatro La Fenice in Venice, with Stefan Vinke, Solveig Kringelborn, and Stephan Genz, conducted by Eliahu Inbal, staged and designed by Pier Luigi Pizzi (DVD: Dynamic)
 2010: Finnish National Opera, with Klaus Florian Vogt, Camilla Nylund, and Markus Eiche, conducted by Mikko Franck, staged by Kasper Holten, designed by Es Devlin (DVD: Opus Arte 2013); same production as performed at New National Theatre Tokyo (March 2014) with Torsten Kerl and Meagan Miller (TV: NHK Premium Theater: 12 May 2014)
2021 BD and DVD release of Bayerische Staatsoper's 2019 production, conducted by Kirill Petrenko and staged by Simon Stone, with Jonas Kaufmann (Paul), Marlis Petersen (Marietta), released by Bayerische Staatsoper Recordings (BSOREC2001).

References

Sources
Palmer, Christopher, "Erich Wolfgang Korngold", Grove Music Online ed. L. Macy (Opera) (Accessed May 4, 2007)

External links

 
German/English libretto at Wikimedia Commons
Korngold Society's synopsis
 Die tote Stadt, Details, Schott Music
, directed by Brian Large
English translation facing German original at OrpheusIreland.ie

Operas by Erich Wolfgang Korngold
1920 operas
Operas set in Belgium
Operas based on novels
German-language operas
Operas
Opera world premieres at the Hamburg State Opera
Bruges in fiction